Timona Poareu (born 26 August 1999) is a French Polynesian athlete specialising in the pole vault and Decathlon. He has represented French Polynesia at the Pacific Games and Polynesian Championships in Athletics.

At the 2019 Pacific Games in Apia he won bronze in the decathlon and silver in the pole-vault.

References

Living people
1999 births
French Polynesian athletes